The Babiker Bedri Scientific Association for Women's Studies (BBSAWS, also written as "Babiker Badri") was formed in Sudan in 1979 after a symposium in February that year, "The Changing Status of Women in Sudan", at Ahfad University for Women in Omdurman. Open to educated women from Sudan, the association's early aims were to set up welfare and education programmes for women in the White Nile and Red Sea states, and to end female genital mutilation, which has a high prevalence in Sudan. Asma El Dareer was one of the association's presidents.

The association was named after Sheikh Babiker Bedri, who in 1907 opened the first girls' school in Rufaa, Sudan. This was regarded as the beginning of the women's liberation movement in that country.


Pledge to end FGM
FGM was traditionally a taboo subject in Sudan, "a ritual performed by women on women". In 1981, BBSAWS held a three-day workshop in Khartoum, "Female Circumcision Mutilates and Endangers Women – Combat it!", at the end of which 150 academics and activists signed a pledge to fight FGM:

Another BBSAWS workshop in 1984, "African Women Speak on Female Circumcision", attracted participants from 24 African countries and around the world. The workshop agreed that FGM is "a violation of human rights, an encroachment on the dignity of women, a debasement of women's sexuality, and an unwarranted affront on the health of women". Identifying it as a human-rights violation was an important step; previously FGM had been regarded as a medical problem, possibly with a medical solution.

References

Further reading

Feminism in Sudan
Women in Sudan